Fulmer Falls is the second waterfall located in the George W. Childs Recreation Site in Dingmans Ferry, Pike County, Pennsylvania, United States of America. The falls are downstream from Factory Falls and upstream from Deer Leap Falls on the Dingmans Creek. At , it is the largest of the three falls.

Gallery

References

Pocono Mountains
Waterfalls of Pike County, Pennsylvania
Cascade waterfalls
Delaware Water Gap National Recreation Area